This was the first edition of the tournament.

Horacio Zeballos won the title after defeating  Roberto Carballés Baena 6–3, 6–4 in the final.

Seeds

Draw

Finals

Top half

Bottom half

References
 Main Draw
 Qualifying Draw

Bastad Challenger - Singles
2016 Singles
Bast